Charles Seaman "Cob" Squyres (March 2, 1910 – November 30, 1979) was an American football halfback who played one season with the Cincinnati Reds of the National Football League. 

His parents were James Elton and Hallie Hawthorne Squyres. His father was with the Santa Fe Railroad and the family lived in Shawnee, Oklahoma, when he was born. Soon afterward the family moved to Cleburne, Texas, where Squyres' athletic ability was soon recognized at Cleburne High School. He was named All-State in football. In 1968, he was dubbed by the Amarillo Globe-News as the hero of the "Greatest High School Upset": Cisco High School was known as an area powerhouse and outweighed the Cleburne team by 30 pounds, but Squyres' punting kept Cisco out of the end zone and the game ended in a 0–0 tie.

Squyres played college football at Rice University then played with the Cincinnati Reds pro football team in 1933. He was married to Dorothy Gately of Chicago.

References

External links
Just Sports Stats

1910 births
1979 deaths
American football halfbacks
Rice Owls football players
Cincinnati Reds (NFL) players
Players of American football from Oklahoma
Sportspeople from Shawnee, Oklahoma